Maurice Cooper Edwards (17 October 1922 – 26 February 2007) was an Australian rules footballer who played with Essendon and North Melbourne in the Victorian Football League (VFL).

Edwards served in the Australian Army during World War II.

Notes

External links 

1922 births
2007 deaths
Australian rules footballers from Victoria (Australia)
Essendon Football Club players
North Melbourne Football Club players
Australian Army personnel of World War II